Rev. Johannes Helfrich (Weisenberg, PA, 1 January 1795 – 1852) was an American pastor and co-founder of the first homeopathic medical school in the United States at Allentown, Pennsylvania.

He was the son of Rev. Johann Henrich Helffrich, originally of Mosbach (Baden).

References

American clergy
American homeopaths
1795 births
1852 deaths
19th-century American clergy